The  Green Bay Packers season was their 56th season overall and their 54th season in the National Football League. The team finished with a 6–8 record under fourth-year head coach Dan Devine, a consecutive third-place finish in the NFC Central division. The Packers lost their last three games, all to non-playoff teams.

With a year remaining on his five-year contract, Devine resigned a day after the last game of the regular season and returned to college football at Notre Dame, following the sudden retirement of Ara Parseghian. Devine was succeeded as head coach at Green Bay by hall of fame quarterback Bart Starr, hired on Christmas Eve.

Offseason

Draft

Roster

Regular season

Schedule 

Monday (October 21)
Note: Intra-division opponents are in bold text.

Game summaries

Week 1 vs Vikings

Week 2 at Colts

Week 3

Week 9 

 Source: Pro-Football-Reference.com

Standings

Awards and records 
 Chester Marcol, NFL Leader, Field Goals Made, (25)
 Don Woods, NFL Offensive Rookie of the Year

References 

 Sportsencyclopedia.com

Green Bay Packers seasons
Green Bay Packers
Green